Sergey Yurievich Cheskidov (born 10 October 1947, Sverdlovsk) is a  Soviet and Russian sports commentator, broadcaster, former head of the editorial board sports channel TV Tsentr.

Biography 
He studied at the Lesgaft National State University of Physical Education, Sport and Health.

In 1968–1970 years - the figure skating coach in Perm, President of the Perm Regional Federation of figure skating. In 1970-1975 - one of the founders and trainer Olympic reserve school CSKA. Among his best students - the world champion among juniors Tatiana Gladkova, Igor Shpilband, Alexey Soloviev, the world champion, Europe and silver medalist Marina Cherkasova, winner of the World Cup Anna Kondrashova. Some skaters were runners-up of the Soviet Union Championship for Juniors and Young Riders.

Since 1976 works on TV. In 1976–1991 years - the reporter, commentator, Soviet Central Television, in particular, the program Vremya, the program  Arena  in the late 1980s - early 1990s (with Anna Dmitrieva),  Chrono  (about racing together Alexey Popov). Producer of TV coverage of international figure skating tournament for the prizes of the newspaper Moskovskiye Novosti.

Co-producer of TV coverage of the Olympics-80 in Moscow, the Goodwill Games 1986, IIHF World Championship (1979 and 1985), the European Figure Skating Championships (1990).

As a commentator skating remember vivid, emotional statements and, together with the deep knowledge of the subject, professionalism, innovative approach: for example, he first became known to invite athletes and experts to participate in TV reports. Commented broadcast with the Intercontinental Cup and FIFA World Hockey Championship for the channel TV Tsentr.

References

External links
  Official Site
Клюшки к бою! // KP.RU

1947 births
Living people
Mass media people from Yekaterinburg
Soviet figure skating coaches
Russian sports journalists
Soviet television presenters
Formula One journalists and reporters
Figure skating commentators